The 1973 South American Rugby Championship was the eighth edition of the competition of the leading national Rugby Union teams in South America.

The tournament was played in San Paolo and won by Argentina.

Standings 

{| class="wikitable"
|-
!width=165|Team
!width=40|Played
!width=40|Won
!width=40|Drawn
!width=40|Lost
!width=40|For
!width=40|Against
!width=40|Difference
!width=40|Pts
|- bgcolor=#ccffcc align=center
|align=left| 
|4||4||0||0||309||6||+ 303||8
|- align=center
|align=left| 
|4||3||0||1||60||80||- 20||6
|- align=center
|align=left| 
|4||2||0||2||62||79||- 17||4
|- align=center
|align=left| 
|4||1||0||3||31||137||- 106||2
|- align=center
|align=left| 
|4||0||0||4||18||178||- 160||0
|}

Results 

First round

Second round

Third round

Fourth round

Fifth round

References 

 IRB – South American Championship 1973

1973
1973 rugby union tournaments for national teams
1973 in Argentine rugby union
rugby union
rugby union
rugby union
rugby union
International rugby union competitions hosted by Brazil